LoCoS (short for Lovers Communication System) is a pictorial language developed by Yukio Ota of Japan in 1964. It was meant as communication for the deaf and mute as well as for the illiterate. It is a universal and simple language, and as Ota put it, "It should emphasize the importance of communication among all the people of all the countries of the world."

Symbols
There are 8 major symbols in LoCoS. There is the Sun or day, represented by a circle. There is man, represented by a ring shape. There is a thing, represented by a square. There is thought, represented by a triangle with a slightly cut off top. There is feeling, represented by a heart. There is land or place, represented by a low straight line. There the question indicator, a question mark. There is, lastly, a point or existence, represented by a single point.

Words
Words are made by combining different symbols in different ways. For example if you put a dot inside a circle it will represent today, or if you put a fish in a ring shape it will be a fisherman. There are around 80 words that are official according to Yukio Ota. Words can be created as long as they follow the basic word syntax.

Sentences
Sentences are formed by a combination of certain words. There are three rows that you use when writing sentences. The middle row is used for the core words (nouns, verbs, and direct/indirect objects). The top row is used to modify verbs with adverbs. The bottom row is used to modify nouns using adjectives.

Bibliography 
 Bliss, C.K. (1965). Semantography (Blissymbolocs). Sydney, Australia: Semantography Publications, second edition, 882 pp. The book presents a system for universal writing, or pasigraphy.
 Ota, Yukio (1973). «LoCoS: An Experimental Pictorial Language.» Icographic, No. 6, pp. 15-19. Published by ICOGRADA, the International Council of Graphic Design Associations, based in London.
 Ota, Yukio (1987). Pictogram Design, Kashiwashobo, Tokyo, 1987. The author presents a world-wide collection of case studies in visible language signage systems, including LoCoS.

Sign systems
Constructed languages